Jhangi is one of the 51 union councils of Abbottabad District in Khyber-Pakhtunkhwa province of Pakistan.

Subdivisions
 Banda Batang
 Banda Faizullah
 Banda Ghazan
 Jhangi

References

Union councils of Abbottabad District

fr:Jhangi